

Events
Raimon de Miravalh, an Occitan troubadour, flees to Spain after the Battle of Muret, vowing not to sing until he has recaptured his castle

Births
 Fakhruddin Iraqi (died 1289), Persian Sufi writer

Deaths
28 November – Huguet de Mataplana (born 1173), troubadour, dies of wounds received in the Battle of Muret
 Gace Brulé (born 1160), French trouvère
 Afdal al-Din Kashani (born unknown), Persian poet and philosopher

See also

Poetry
 List of years in poetry

13th-century poetry
Poetry